The Courage Foundation is an international organisation based in Germany, the UK and the US that supports whistleblowers and journalists by fundraising for their legal defence.

Founded on August 9, 2013, as the Journalistic Source Protection Defence Fund by Gavin MacFadyen, Barbora Bukovska and Julian Assange it later rebranded in June 2014.

WikiLeaks section editor Sarah Harrison served as acting director from 2014 until April 2017, when WikiLeaks became a Courage beneficiary and Naomi Colvin began serving as director. Colvin served as director until 2018. The trustees include Pentagon Papers whistleblower Daniel Ellsberg, former NSA executive Thomas Drake, former MI5 British intelligence officer and whistleblower Annie Machon, Vice President of the Wau Holland Foundation Andy Müller-Maguhn, Guatemala human rights lawyer Renata Ávila, and some members of Pussy Riot.

The Courage Foundation supports Julian Assange and WikiLeaks. The Courage Foundation supported Edward Snowden (NSA whistleblower), Jeremy Hammond (Stratfor hacktivist), Matt DeHart, Lauri Love and Chelsea Manning.

The Courage trustees are Susan Benn, and John Pilger. Renata Ávila was a trustee before retiring in April 2018 and Dame Vivienne Westwood was a trustee before she died.

In October 2019, a former Organisation for the Prohibition of Chemical Weapons (OPCW) employee later identified as Brendan Whelan presented his dissent with the OPCW's findings about the investigation of the Douma chemical attack. Members of the Courage Foundation who attended included Kristinn Hrafnsson, Jose Bustani, Helmut Lohre and Gunter Meyer. Courage Foundation published the Statement of Concern at the same time as "Berlin Group 21", which was allegedly created as a front for the Working Group on Syria, Propaganda and Media. Whelan later leaked OPCW documents to WikiLeaks.

In November 2022, the Courage Foundations website went offline.

Controversy 
In 2018, three of the trustees decided to remove Barrett Brown from the Courage Foundation's beneficiary list over "nasty adversarial remarks" he had made about Julian Assange, and a decision was made to prioritise the case of Wikileaks over all other beneficiaries. Courage trustee Susan Benn told Brown that Courage would no longer help him, writing in an email that "You have made a number of hostile and denigrating statements about other Courage beneficiaries who are facing grave legal and personal risks. Courage expects solidarity and mutual aid from its beneficiaries, especially when those among you face extreme uncertainty and danger." 

In response, Courage Foundation Director Naomi Colvin quit in protest and Brown alleged that he had only been given about $3,500 out of the total $14,000 that had been donated to Courage for him. Renata Ávila called Brown's comments "disloyal and unacceptable."

References

External links 
 
 Twitter
Edward Snowden
Whistleblowing
Whistleblower support organizations
WikiLeaks